The Orthodox Catholic Church of France, formerly Orthodox Church of France (OCF), is an Eastern Orthodox church in France comprising three dioceses and using the Western Rite. Though the OCF has been in communion with various canonical E. Orthodox churches during its history, at present it is not.

Foundation
, Roman Catholic priest, left the Catholic Church as a result of Modernism. 
Winnaert, along with a group of parishioners, joined the Anglican Church in 1918. Winnaert and his adherents then separated from the Anglican Church and joined the Old Catholic Church in 1921.
Winnaert and his adherents then separated from the Old Catholic Church and joined the Liberal Catholic Church in 1922. Their group,  (Free Catholic Church of France), was registered as a religious association in April 1922.
Bishop James Ingall Wedgwood, of the Liberal Catholic Church, consecrated Winnaert as bishop.
According to The Tablet, at the time of application to come into full communion with the Russian Orthodox Church (ROC) in 1932, Winnaert's group had a membership of 1500 adherents, ministered by six priests and one deacon, in parishes located in Paris, Rouen, Brussels, Holland, and Rome.
The  agreed to receive Winnaert and his group into full communion in 1936. The episcopal ordination of Winnaert was declared doubtful.

Also associated with the Kovalevsky group, Archimandrite Alexis van der Mensbrugghe, a former Roman Catholic priest, desired to restore an ancient Roman rite, by replacing medieval accretions with Gallican and Byzantine interpolations – though Mensbrugghe remained separate from the OCF.

See also
 Christianity in France
 Eastern Orthodoxy in France
 Oriental Orthodoxy in France

References

Further reading

External links
 

Western Rite Orthodoxy
France
Independent Eastern Orthodox denominations
Eastern Orthodoxy in France
Christian organizations established in 1936
Christian denominations established in the 20th century
Eastern Orthodox organizations established in the 20th century